Masalan Kisa (abbreviated MasKi) is a sports club from Masala in Kirkkonummi, Finland. The club was formed in 1963 and covers the sports of football, pesäpallo, badminton, gymnastics, basketball, floorball, volleyball and beach volleyball.  MasKi also make provision for aerobics and other dance fitness classes.  In addition the club organises various sports and recreation events.  The club has in excess of 700 members.

Football

MasKi is one of three football clubs in Kirkkonummi. The other clubs are Kyrkslätt Idrottsförening and Veikkolan Veikot.  In addition there is the women's football club known as AC Kirkkonummi.

MasKi runs two men's football teams, two veteran teams and a futsal team. In addition there is an active junior section catering for a large number of age groups.  Teams practice 2–3 times a week.  In the winter training is centred in school halls and the Blue Arena indoor hall. Training takes place mainly in summer at the Masala and Luoma sports fields. A number of teams participate in tournaments at home and abroad.

The MasKi men's first team play their home matches at the Kirkkonummen urheilupuisto.  In 2009 season they finished runners-up in Section 1 (Lohko 1) of the Nelonen administered by the Uusimaa SPL and were promoted to the Kolmonen.

Season to season

2010 season

For the current season MasKi are competing in Section 1 (Lohko 1) of the Kolmonen administered by the Helsinki SPL and Uusimaa SPL.  This is the fourth highest tier in the Finnish football system.

 MasKi 2 are participating in Section 1 (Lohko 1) of the Kutonen administered by the Uusimaa SPL.

External links
Official website

Football clubs in Finland
Kirkkonummi
1963 establishments in Finland